The R295 road is a regional road in Ireland that runs from Ballymote, County Sligo to Boyle, County Roscommon. From Ballymote the road passes by Feenagh lough and of past the Caves of Kesh. It continues by ascending over the Curlew Mountains before descending into Boyle from the west.

See also
Roads in Ireland
National primary road
National secondary road

References
Roads Act 1993 (Classification of Regional Roads) Order 2006 – Department of Transport

Regional roads in the Republic of Ireland
Roads in County Sligo
Roads in County Roscommon